Piero Sicoli (born 1954) is an Italian astronomer and discoverer of minor planets, observing at the Italian Sormano Astronomical Observatory. As the observatory's coordinator, he is responsible for close encounters computation of near-Earth objects (NEOs), orbit computations, and identification of asteroids (about one thousand, included 17 NEOs). The Observatory's focus is the examination and tracking of NEOs in Solar System.

The Nysa asteroid 7866 Sicoli, discovered by Edward Bowell at Anderson Mesa Station in 1982, is named in his honor.

List of discovered minor planets

Publications 
 "The orbit of (944) Hidalgo", British Astron. Assoc. Jnl., (1990, M. Cavagna, P. Sicoli)
 "Future Earth Approaches of (4179) Toutatis", Minor Planet Bulletin, (1992, M. Cavagna, P. Sicoli) 
 "Earth Close Approaches of Minor Planet (7482) 1994 PC1", Minor Planet Bulletin, (1997, P. Sicoli) 
 "Asteroid and Planet Close Encounters", Minor Planet Bulletin, (1999, F. Manca, P. Sicoli) 
 "Monitoring Hazardous Objects", Proceedings of the Third Italian Meeting of Planetary Science, (2000, F. Manca, P. Sicoli) 
 "Giuseppe Piazzi and the Discovery of Ceres", Asteroids III, (2002, G. Fodera' Serio, A. Manara, P. Sicoli) 
 "Planetary Close Encounters", Proceedings of the Fourth Italian Meeting of Planetary Science, (2002, F. Manca, P. Sicoli)
 "Killed by a meteorite?", Mercury, (2003, P. Sicoli, C.J. Cunningham)  
 "Identification of asteroids and comets: methods and results", Proceedings of the X National Conference on Planetary Science. (2011, F. Manca, P. Sicoli, and A. Testa)

References 
 

1954 births
Discoverers of asteroids

21st-century Italian astronomers
Living people
Planetary scientists
20th-century Italian astronomers